The Gibson Brothers are a French musical group, originally from Martinique, who had their greatest success during the disco boom of the late 1970s.  Their best known hit singles included "Cuba" and "Que Sera Mi Vida".

Career
The three brothers, Chris Francfort (born 20 June 1954, lead vocals, percussion), Patrick Francfort (23 February 1957 – 4 April 2020, vocals, drums) and Alex Francfort (vocals, keyboards), were born in Lamentin Acajou on Martinique. They traveled with their parents to Paris in the mid-1950s, and in 1969 joined the group Phalansters, formed by Jean-Jacques Goldman. They also formed the group Martinique Express, who appeared on French television alongside Guy Lux. They were seen by record producer Daniel Vangarde, who changed the name of their group to The Gibson Brothers.

They recorded their first single "Come to America" in Paris in 1976, and both it and its follow-up "Non Stop Dance" made the charts in Europe, where they toured successfully. The following year they released "Heaven", which was picked up by TK Records in the U.S.

In 1978 they recorded "Cuba". In the UK it made No. 41 on its initial release, and No. 12 when reissued in 1980. Like most of their other hits, it was written and produced by Vangarde, and the Belgian producer Jean Kluger. The Gibson Brothers had three further big hits in 1979 and 1980 with "Ooh! What a Life" and "Que Sera Mi Vida".

Patrick Francfort, known as Patrick Gibson, died on April 4, 2020, from COVID-19.

Discography

Albums

Singles

References

External links
 Official website
 Official myspace page
 

Eurodisco groups
French musical groups
Island Records artists
Musical groups established in 1976
1976 establishments in France
Family musical groups
Sibling musical trios